NA-120 Lahore-IV is a constituency for the National Assembly of Pakistan.

Members of Parliament

2018-2022: NA-127 Lahore-V

Election 2002 

General elections were held on 10 Oct 2002. Javed Hashmi of PML-N won by 30,372 votes.

Election 2008 

General elections were held on 18 Feb 2008. Javed Hashmi of PML-N won by 67,707 votes.

Election 2013 

General elections were held on 11 May 2013. Muhammad Pervaiz Malik of PML-N won by 126,878 votes and became the  member of National Assembly.

Election 2018 

General elections were held on 25 July 2018.

See also
NA-119 Lahore-III
NA-121 Lahore-V

References

External links 
 Election result's official website

NA-123